This is a list of holidays in Niue.

References

Niue
Niuean culture
Public holidays in Oceania